Jim Qualey is an American state representative in Cheshire County, New Hampshire, for the Republican Party.

Political career
He was elected to the New Hampshire House of Representatives in 2020 with 27% of the vote, with the campaign slogan "Live Free or Die". His seat represents Fitzwilliam and Rindge.

He sits on the Election Law Committee and has supported articles calling for more parental approval of educational material in local schools; in his area, such proposals were dismissed. He expressed an interest in bringing it back, and criticized the school district for not acknowledging it anyway.

Personal life
Qualey received his BA from Daniel Webster College and a PhD from Pennsylvania State University.

References

Republican Party members of the New Hampshire House of Representatives
Year of birth missing (living people)
Living people
Daniel Webster College alumni
Pennsylvania State University alumni